Kaimur  may refer to:
 Kaimur Range, a hill range running across Madhya Pradesh, Uttar Pradesh and Bihar in India
 Kaimur district, an administrative district in Bihar, India
 Kaimur Wildlife Sanctuary, a wildlife refuge in the Kaimur Range of Bihar
 Kymore, a town and a nagar panchayat in Katni district in the Indian state of Madhya Pradesh